The 1960 Ludlow by-election was a parliamentary by-election for the British House of Commons constituency of Ludlow on 16 November 1960.

Vacancy
The by-election was caused by the death of the sitting Conservative MP, Christopher Holland-Martin on 5 April 1960. He had been MP here since holding the seat in 1951.

Election history
Ludlow had been won by the Conservatives at every election since 1950 when they gained the seat from the Liberals. The result at the last General election was as follows;

Candidates
The Conservatives selected 53-year-old Jasper More. He was a landowner and farmer and since 1955 had chaired the Shropshire branch of the Country Landowners' Association. He became a Shropshire County Councillor in 1958. He was educated at Eton College and King's College, Cambridge, becoming a barrister, called by Lincoln's Inn and Middle Temple in 1930. His career at the bar ended with the outbreak of World War II. He was a civilian employee of the Ministry of Economic Warfare and the Ministry of Aircraft Production and Light Metals Control until 1942, was commissioned as an Army legal officer on the General List in 1943, and was in Italy until 1945 and with the military government of the Dodecanese until 1946. In 1944, he married Clare Hope-Edwards, also a Shropshire landowner. 
Labour re-selected 32-year-old John Garwell, a schoolmaster. He contested Ludlow in 1959. He was educated at Nottingham High School, Nottingham University and Birmingham University. He was a Member of Warwick Rural District Council, the Midlands New Towns Association, and the Fabian Society.
The Liberals intervened and selected 52-year-old Lt-Col. Denis Rees. He had contested neighbouring Oswestry in 1959. He was an industrial relations adviser. He was educated at Caterham School and McGill University, Canada. He was Mayor of Pembroke from 1937-38. He was Chairman of South Wales Liberal Federation.

Campaign
Even though the previous MP died on 5 April 1960, Polling Day was not fixed until 16 November 1960.

Result

Aftermath
Only More went on to contest the seat at the following elections. Rees contested Cardiff North and Garwell contested Birmingham Selly Oak. The result at the 1964 general election;

References

See also
 List of United Kingdom by-elections
 United Kingdom by-election records
 

1960 elections in the United Kingdom
By-elections to the Parliament of the United Kingdom in Shropshire constituencies
1960 in England
Ludlow
20th century in Shropshire